General Myers may refer to:

John Twiggs Myers (1871–1952), U.S. Marine Corps lieutenant general 
Richard Myers (born 1942), U.S. Air Force four-star general
Sir William Myers, 1st Baronet (1750/51–1805), British Army lieutenant general

See also
Albert J. Myer (1828–1880), U.S. Army brigadier general
Attorney General Myers (disambiguation)